Rolling Home is a 1946 American film directed by William Berke and starring Jean Parker, Russell Hayden, and Pamela Blake.

Plot

Cast 
Jean Parker as Frances Crawford
Russell Hayden as Reverend David Owens
Pamela Blake as Pamela Crawford
Raymond Hatton as Pop Miller
Jo Ann Marlowe as Sandy Crawford
Jimmy Conlin as Grandpa Crawford
Robert Henry as Gary Miller – Grandson
Jonathan Hale as Henry Kane
George Tyne as Joe
Milton Parsons as Charlie Kane
Harry Carey Jr. as Dobey
William Farnum as Rodeo official
Elmo Lincoln as Racing official
André Charlot as Dr. Clark
Jimmie Dodd as Cowboy guitarist

References

External links 

 (alternative copy)

1946 films
1946 drama films
1940s English-language films
American black-and-white films
Films directed by William A. Berke
American drama films
Lippert Pictures films
1940s American films